Roberto Alfredo Perfumo (3 October 1942 – 10 March 2016) was an Argentine footballer and sports commentator. Nicknamed El Mariscal, Perfumo is considered one of the best Argentine defenders ever. At club level, Perfumo played for Racing, River Plate and Brazilian team Cruzeiro. With the national team, he played the 1966 and 1974 World Cups.

Biography

Perfumo was born in Sarandí and his first approach to football was to play in his neighborhood team, named "Pulqui". In 1960 he debuted at the 5th. division of River Plate. Perfumo then became player of Racing Club, where he debuted in January 1964 in a friendly match against Flamengo played at Santiago, Chile.

Perfumo's first position at the field was midfielder but he began to play as right back in the Racing reserve team. He debuted in Primera División promoted by Néstor Rossi during a match against Ferro Carril Oeste. Playing with Racing Club Perfumo was regarded as one of the best Argentine defenders, winning the Primera title, the Copa Libertadores and the Intercontinental Cup. In all those tournaments Perfumo was praised by media and fans as the most notable player of Racing Club.

After retirement, he worked as a football commentator for ESPN and for TV Pública show Fútbol para todos.

Perfumo died at 73 from a skull injury after falling from a stairway while dining with fellow journalists at a Buenos Aires restaurant in the neighbourhood of Puerto Madero, on 10 March 2016.

Honours

Player 

Racing Club
Primera División (2): 1961, 1966
Copa Libertadores (1): 1967
Intercontinental Cup (1): 1967

Cruzeiro
Campeonato Mineiro (3): 1972, 1973, 1974

River Plate
Primera División (3): 1975 Metropolitano, 1975 Nacional, 1977 Metropolitano

Manager 

Gimnasia y Esgrima La Plata
 Copa Centenario (1): 1993

References

External links

1942 births
2016 deaths
Argentine people of Italian descent
Argentine footballers
Cruzeiro Esporte Clube players
Club Atlético River Plate footballers
Racing Club de Avellaneda footballers
Club Olimpia managers
Olympic footballers of Argentina
Footballers at the 1964 Summer Olympics
1966 FIFA World Cup players
1974 FIFA World Cup players
Sportspeople from Avellaneda
Argentina international footballers
Argentine football managers
Racing Club de Avellaneda managers
Club de Gimnasia y Esgrima La Plata managers
Expatriate footballers in Brazil
Argentine Primera División players
Argentine expatriate footballers
Argentine expatriate sportspeople in Brazil
Sports commentators
Argentine expatriate sportspeople in Paraguay
Expatriate football managers in Paraguay
Accidental deaths in Argentina
Accidental deaths from falls
Association football defenders